Robert Thornby (March 27, 1888 – March 6, 1953) was an American director and actor of the silent era. He directed 75 films between 1913 and 1927. He also appeared in 48 films between 1911 and 1930. He was born in New York, New York, and died in Los Angeles, California.

Selected filmography

 When Ghost Meets Ghost (1913)
 Bianca (1913)
 On Dangerous Ground (1917)
 A Little Sister of Everybody (1918)
 Lawless Love (1918)
 Her Inspiration (1918)
 Carolyn of the Corners (1919)
 The Prince and Betty (1919)
 Fighting Cressy (1919)
 Are You Legally Married? (1919)
 The Deadlier Sex (1920)
 Simple Souls (1920)
 The Girl in the Web (1920)
 Felix O'Day (1920)
 The Magnificent Brute (1921)
 That Girl Montana (1921)
 The Fox (1921)
 The Blazing Trail (1921)
 The Trap (1922)
 The Sagebrush Trail (1922)
 Stormswept (1923)
 The Drivin' Fool (1923)
 West of Broadway (1926)
 Young Hollywood (1927)
 Today (1930)

References

External links

1888 births
1953 deaths
American film directors
American male film actors
American male silent film actors
Male actors from New York City
20th-century American male actors